Mekan may refer to:
 Mekan people (also called Me'en), an ethnic minority group in Ethiopia
 Me'en language (also called Mekan), a Nilo-Saharan language spoken in Ethiopia
 Mekan clan, a Jatt clan in Pakistan
Mekan Nasyrow (born 1982), a Turkmenistan footballer